Timothy John Entwisle (born 1960), is an Australian botanist, much of whose research work is in phycology (algae). See for example the articles. He was awarded a Ph.D. from La Trobe University in 1986 for work on the taxonomy of Vaucheria.

He was New South Wales’ Government Botanist in 2007 and 2008,  and for eight years was  the executive director of the Royal Botanic Gardens Sydney (2003–2011).  Subsequently, he was director of Conservation, Living Collections and Estates, Kew, London from 2011, and since 2013 he has been director of the Royal Botanic Gardens Victoria.  He is an honorary professorial fellow at the University of Melbourne and is currently (2020)  president of the International Association of Botanic Gardens.

As director of the Royal Botanic Gardens Sydney, Entwisle managed Sydney's Royal Botanic Gardens, the Mount Tomah Botanic Garden, in the Blue Mountains and the Mount Annan Botanic Garden, near Camden, and at Kew, he was responsible for Kew Gardens, Wakehurst Place, and the Millennium Seed Bank. A major project on taking up the Victorian appointment has been succession planning for the gardens under climate change.

He values communicating with the general public as well as the scientific community. He is interviewed on radio frequently and had a program, Talking Plants, on ABC radio,, which ran from December 2014 to January 2016. He is a regular contributor to the ABC radio program, Blueprint for living. He also writes blogs on plants, and articles for Gardening Australia.

In 2022, Tim was on the panel of expert judges for ABC’s ‘Australia’s Favourite Tree’ competition, where he appeared on episodes of ABC TV’s show Catalyst. He also helped select the short-listed trees for a public poll which drew 265,000 responses over three weeks and contributed to ABC’s live blog and various ABC radio conversations about the poll.

In the same year, Thames &Hudson published his memoir called ‘Evergreen: The Botanic Life of a Plant Punk’ about his experiences as director of Royal Botanic Gardens in Sydney, Kew and Melbourne, as well as his life influences and perspectives, particularly about the role of public gardens. His love of garage music and algae feature in the early years, and there is a chapter on the very public removal of ten fig trees in Sydney during his time as director there.

He continues to publish in phycology.

Honours
The algal genus, Entwisleia F.J.Scott, G.W.Saunders & Kraft, 2013, was named for him.

Some published names
(in Algae, as T.J.Entwisle)
Audouinella scopulata S.Skinner & T.J.Entwisle
Batrachospermum americanum (Harvey) O.Necchi & T.J.Entwisle (currently accepted name: Tuomeya americana (Kützing) Papenfuss)
Batrachospermum anatinum var. australe Skuja ex T.J.Entwisle
Batrachospermum deminutum Entwisle & Foard

(Some 120 algal species listed, not all currently accepted)

Publications 
(incomplete)

Books

Entwistle, T.J. (2014) Sprinter and Sprummer Australia's Changing Seasons CSIRO publishing

Articles

Entwisle, T.J. 1992. The setaceous species of Batrachospermum (Rhodophyta): a re-evaluation of B. atrum (Hudson) Harvey and B. puiggarianum Grunow including the description of B. diatyches sp. nov. from Tasmania, Australia. Muelleria 7: 425–445.
Entwisle, T.J. 1995. Batrachospermum antipodites sp. nov. (Batrachospermaceae): a widespread freshwater red alga in eastern Australia and New Zealand. Muelleria 8(3): 291–298.

Entwisle, T.J. & Foard, H.J. 1998. [Batrachospermum latericium sp. nov. (Batrachospermales, Rhodophyta) from Tasmania, Australia, with new observations on B. atrum and a discussion of their relationships. Muelleria 11: 27–40, 5 figs.

</ref>

 pdf

References

External links
Talking Plants (Tim Entwisle Blog)
Talking Plants Too (Tim Entwisle Blog)

20th-century Australian botanists
Living people
1960 births
Phycologists
La Trobe University alumni
21st-century Australian botanists